The Commissioner's Cup may refer to:

 Commissioner's Cup (SPHL), former name of the William B. Coffey Trophy of the Southern Professional Hockey League in the US
 PBA Commissioner's Cup, a tournament of the Philippine Basketball Association
 WNBA Commissioner's Cup, an in-season tournament operated by the Women's National Basketball Association